The Sahitya Akademi Award is given to writers for their outstanding contributions to Indian and Telugu literature. It has been given each year since 1955 by the Sahitya Akademi (India's National Academy of Letters).

Winners 

Bala Sahitya puraskar winners and their works in Telugu language

See also
 List of Sahitya Akademi Translation Prize winners for Telugu

References

External links
 Official listing of Sahitya Akademi Awards in Telugu language

Sahitya Akademi Award

Sahitya Akademi Award
Telugu
1955 establishments in India